Sohni Mahiwal is a classic love story from Sindh and Punjab.

Sohni Mahiwal may also refer to:
 Sohni Mahiwal (1946 film), 1946 Indian film
 Sohni Mahiwal (1958 film), 1958 Indian Hindi-language film, starring Bharat Bhushan and Nimmi
 Sohni Mahiwal (1984 film), 1984 Indian Hindi-language film, starring Sunny Deol and Poonam Dhillon